Highest Duty: My Search for What Really Matters is a 2009 memoir written by Chesley Sullenberger and Jeffrey Zaslow (1958–2012) describing the events of US Airways Flight 1549. The New York Times bestselling autobiography of Capt. Chesley “Sully” Sullenberger—the pilot who landed a crippled airplane in New York's Hudson River, saving the lives of the 155 passengers and crew—discusses leadership, responsibility, and service, along with his life story.

Kirkus Reviews described it as "valuable for anyone interested in how a life lived with integrity prepares a man for the ultimate challenge." A review in The Mercury News praised its "meticulous attention to white-knuckle detail".

Clint Eastwood directed a 2016 film adaptation called Sully that received positive reviews from critics.

References

US Airways Group
Airbus A320 family
Hudson River
Autobiographies
Aviation books
Autobiographies adapted into films
William Morrow and Company books
2009 non-fiction books